Guiteras is a surname. Notable people with the surname include:

 Antonio Guiteras (1906–1935), Cuban politician
 Juan Guiteras (1852–1925), Cuban physician and pathologist
 Ramon Guiteras (1858–1917), American urologist, cousin of Juan